Expansivity may refer to:

 Expansive homeomorphism
 Expansive Poetry
 Expansive clay
 Expansive Catasetum
 Expansive drill bit
 Expansive Heart

See also
 Expansion (disambiguation)